Arthur James Diamond (c. 1844 – 22 June 1906) was an Australian businessman and politician who was a member of the Legislative Assembly of Western Australia from 1901 until his death, representing the seat of South Fremantle.

Diamond was born in Derry, Ireland. He came to Australia in 1867, initially living in Victoria and then going to South Australia. Diamond settled in Adelaide, where he developed broad commercial interests, including the manufacture of jewellery. In 1878, he helped to found the Norwood Football Club, an Australian rules football club, subsequently serving as club secretary and treasurer. In 1883, Diamond served as president of the South Australian Football Association. Diamond moved to Fremantle, Western Australia, in 1886, and maintained his link with football, becoming president of the Fremantle Football Club in 1890. He was also vice-president of the West Australian Football Association in 1896.

In Fremantle, Diamond's business interests focused on his customs and shipping agency, but he also branched out into the wholesale liquor trade. A former president of the Fremantle Lumpers Union, he stood for the seat of Fremantle at the 1894 general election and the 1896 by-election, but was defeated both times (by William Marmion and John Higham, respectively). Diamond was eventually elected to parliament at the 1901 general election, replacing the retiring Elias Solomon as the member for South Fremantle. He initially sat in parliament as an independent, but in 1904 joined the Ministerialist faction, which had future premier Hector Rason as its leader. Diamond was re-elected at the 1904 and 1905 elections. However, in April 1906, he suffered a paralytic stroke and cerebral haemorrhage, which led to his death two months later. Diamond had married Ellen Louisa Goldeney in 1868, with whom he had three sons and a daughter.

References

1840s births
1924 deaths
Australian trade unionists
Irish emigrants to colonial Australia
Members of the Western Australian Legislative Assembly
Norwood Football Club administrators
South Australian National Football League administrators
West Australian Football League administrators
Businesspeople from Adelaide
19th-century Australian politicians
20th-century Australian politicians
People from Derry (city)